The Arbutoideae are a subfamily in the plant family Ericaceae. Phylogenetic analysis supported all genera of the subfamily as monophyletic, except Arbutus. Moreover, it was suggested that the non-sister relationship between Mediterranean and North American species may be explained by a once widespread distribution in the Northern hemisphere before the Neogene.

The genera Arbutus, Arctostaphylos, Comarostaphylis form a particular type of mycorrhizal symbiosis with the fungus, Arbutoid mycorrhiza, which resembles ectomycorrhizas.

Genera List

References

External links 
 
 Arbutoideae in the Flora of North America

 
Asterid subfamilies